Bashiru Ademola Raji,   is a Nigerian professor of soil science, Pedologist,  geologist, environmental impact assessment expert and the former Vice chancellor of Fountain University, Osogbo. 

He was the second substantive Vice chancellor of the University. His research interest is in the area of soil survey, Land-use planning, environmental impact assessment of natural resource utilization and Pedology, the study of soils in their natural environment. It deals with Pedogenesis, the science and study of the processes that lead to the formation of soil  and first explored by the Russian geologist Vasily Dokuchaev. 

He is the president of the Soil Science Society of Nigeria.

Higher Education 
He obtained a Bachelor of Science and Master of Science degree in Geology before he received a Doctorate in soil science from Ahmadu Bello University, Zaria. He later obtained a postgraduate diploma in soil survey from the International Institute for Aerospace Survey and Earth Science (ITC) in Enschede, Netherlands.

Background
Bashiru Ademola Raji' was born in Offa, a city and Local Government Area located in Kwara State, North-Central Nigeria. He obtained a Bachelor of Science and Master of Science degree in Geology before he received a Doctorate   in soil science from Ahmadu Bello University, Zaria. He later obtained a postgraduate diploma in soil survey from the International Institute for Aerospace Survey and Earth Science (ITC) in Enschede, Netherlands.
He began his academic career at Ahmadu Bello University where he became a professor of soil science and served as Dean of student affairs. He served as Assistant Dean of  Postgraduate School, Faculty of Agriculture from 2003 - 2005 before he was  appointed as Dean of student affairs. Prior to this, he was Head of the  department of soil science, faculty of agriculture, and the director of academic planning and monitoring unit of the university from 2006 to  2008.
In 2003, he became a member of Ahmadu Bello University Senate representative of the Governing Board of National Agricultural Extension Research Liaison Services and served in that capacity for two years.
He was formerly a visiting professor at the University of Ilorin where he coordinated the department of forest resources management for two years (2013 - 2013).
In December 2012, he was appointed as the second substantive Vice chancellor of Fountain University. He succeeded Professor Bukoye Oloyede, the pioneer Vice chancellor of the University.

Honours and recognition
Raji is a fellow of the African Scientific Institute and fellow of the Soil Science Society of Nigeria. He is the President of the Soil Science Society of Nigeria.

See also
 List of Vice-chancellors of Nigerian universities

References

External links
 Official website (archived)
 List of Nigerian Private Universities
 List of Nigerian Private Universities

Living people
Vice-Chancellors of Nigerian universities
Ahmadu Bello University alumni
Academic staff of Ahmadu Bello University
Nigerian geologists
Nigerian environmentalists
Soil scientists
Year of birth missing (living people)